Bhotia or Bhotiya may refer to:

Bhotia people, a generic term for people of the Himalayas
Bhotia language, a reference to any of the languages spoken by Bhotia people
Bhotia dog, breed of livestock guardian dog also known as the Himalayan sheepdog

See also 
Bhutia